

Storms
Note:  indicates the name was retired after that usage in the respective basin

Caitlin
 1991 – relieved a drought on Okinawa and killed 18 in Korea and the Philippines.
 1994 – strong tropical storm that killed 8 people in China, with 9 missing.

Caleb (2017) – tropical cyclone north of the Cocos Islands.

Caloy
 2002 – a tropical depression that was only recognized by PAGASA and JTWC.
 2006 – struck the Philippines and China.
 2010 – PAGASA name for Typhoon Chanthu which struck China.
 2014 – a weak tropical depression.
 2018 – a Category 4 typhoon that affected a few Pacific islands.
 2022 – a typhoon that affected Southern China in July 2022.

Calvin
 1981 – briefly threatened Baja California Sur.
 1987 – did not make landfall.
 1993 – killed 37 people in Mexico.
 1999 – storm was over open waters so there were no reports of deaths or damage.
 2005 – briefly threatened Acapulco but moved away.
 2011 – stayed off the coast of Mexico.
 2017 – minimal tropical storm that made landfall in southwestern Mexico.

Cam
 1996 – no threat to land.
 1999 – minimal disruption in Hong Kong.

Camille
 1969 – was the second most intense tropical cyclone on record to strike the United States (behind the 1935 Labor Day hurricane) and is one of just four Category 5 hurricanes to make landfall in the U.S.
 1975 – a strong tropical cyclone that made landfall to Madagascar in January 1975.

Candice (1976) – a powerful category 1 hurricane passed off the coast of the United States and Atlantic Canada.

Cari (2015) – a subtropical storm in the South Atlantic.

Carina
 2006 – a powerful Category 4 tropical cyclone in the South Indian Ocean that only slightly affected Madagascar.
 2012 – affected South China and Taiwan as a tropical storm.
 2016 – a severe tropical storm that made landfall over South China.
 2020 – a minor tropical depression.

Carla
 1956 – produced gale-force winds over New England.
 1961 –  second most intense storm to ever strike the Texas coast; caused over $2 billion (2005 US dollars) in damages
 1962 – landfall on Hainan Island; at least 13 people were killed
 1965 – 
 1967 – hit Taiwan, showering record rainfall amounts on the island, killing 69 people
 1971 – 
 1974 – 
 1977 – hit Vietnam.

Carlos
 1979 – did not make landfall
 1985 – did not affect land
 1991 – no damage reports
 1997 – never threatened land; no casualties or damage were reported
 2003 – damaged about 30,000 houses in Mexico, with a monetary damage total of 86.7 million pesos (2003 MXN, $8 million 2003 USD)
 2009 – did not affect land
 2011 – a severe tropical cyclone bringing heavy rainfall over Northern Australia where a record three-day total of 684.8 mm (26.96 in) rain was recorded at Darwin International Airport
 2015 – a small tropical cyclone which brushed the western coast of Mexico
 2017 – a tropical cyclone that persisted off the coast of Madagascar
 2021 - a weak tropical cyclone that churned open at sea

Carlotta
 1967 – formed near the Mexican coast; did not make landfall.
 1971 – no land was affected.
 1972 – a severe tropical cyclone that affected the Solomon Islands, Vanuatu and New Caledonia.
 1975 – did not come near land.
 1978 – category 4 hurricane that did not affect land; at the time, it was the third strongest June storm, after 1973's Ava and 1976's Annette.
 1982 – did not make landfall.
 1988 – did not make landfall.
 1994 – buffeted Socorro Island with sustained winds of 39 mph (63 km/h).
 2000 – killed 18 after sinking a freighter.
 2006 – brought light rainfall to Mexico.
 2012 – made landfall near Puerto Escondido, Mexico.
 2018 – brushed the southwestern coast of Mexico without making landfall.

Carmen
 1949 – a category 2 typhoon that affected the Philippines in mid-January.
 1952 – a category 3 typhoon that passed off the coast of the Philippines and Japan.
 1957 – made landfall in southern China.
 1960 – made landfall in South Korea; 24 casualties and $2 million in damage (1960 USD).
 1963 – a powerful Category 4 typhoon that hit the Philippines, China and Vietnam
 1964 – a moderately severe tropical cyclone that struck the state of the Northern Territory.
 1965 – a powerful category 5 typhoon that killed 209 people.
 1968 (September) – not areas land.
 1968 (December) – passed west of Rodriguez, causing heavy rains and winds.
 1971 (September) – hit Japan.
 1971 (November) – not areas land
 1974 (August) – made landfall on the Yucatán Peninsula, then crossed the Gulf of Mexico and made a second landfall in southern Louisiana; killed 8 people and caused at least $162 million (USD) in damage.
 1974 (October) – hit Luzon just days after Typhoon Bess; second landfall on southeastern China; 25 fatalities, with damage estimated at $13 million (1974 USD).
 1968 – a category 1 typhoon that affected China and South Korea.
 1980 – formed in the Central Pacific
 1983 – formed off the coast of Vietnam and moved toward the Luzon Strait; eventually absorbed into Typhoon Abby.
 1986 –  passed between Rota and Saipan.
 2010 – an extratropical cyclone and European windstorm which crossed the Atlantic Ocean and affected the United Kingdom, Ireland, France, Belgium, and the Netherlands in November 2010.
 2013 – named Carmen by  the European Windstorm Centre
 2017 – affecting France and other western European countries with strong winds

Carol
 1947 – a Category 3 typhoon that passed near the Philippines and then Taiwan.
 1953 – a Category 5 Cape Verde-type hurricane that made landfall in New Brunswick as a minimal hurricane.
 1954 – a Category 3 hurricane that made landfall on Long Island, New York, and then in Connecticut.
 1965 – a long-lived Category 1 hurricane that remained in the open ocean.
 1966 – re-designated Cyclone Daisy by Météo-France after crossing into the south-west Indian basin.
 1972 – a severe tropical cyclone that never impacted land.
 1976 – remained in the open ocean.
 1980 – a severe tropical cyclone that developed southwest of Timor and moved westward through the open ocean; interacted with the weaker Cyclone Dan to its north.

Caroline (1975) – was one of two tropical cyclones to affect northern Mexico during the 1975.

Carrie
 1957 – a long-lived Cape Verde-type system that peaked as a Category 4 major hurricane.
 1972 – affected the Northeastern United States and the Maritime provinces of Canada.

Cary
 1980 – while forming, it crossed the Philippines without impact.
 1984 – no impact on land.
 1987 – made landfall on Luzon, Philippines, and later in northern Vietnam.

Catarina (2004) – was an extremely rare South Atlantic tropical cyclone, the only recorded hurricane strength storm on record in the South Atlantic Ocean.

Celeste
 1960 – developed from the remnants of Atlantic Basin Hurricane Abby; did not make landfall.
 1968 – did not make landfall.
 1972 – a long-lived Category 4 hurricane that made landfall on Johnston Atoll.
 1976 – remained in the open ocean.
 1996 – formed in the Coral Sea and rapidly intensified into a Category 3 severe tropical cyclone (Australian scale); approached Bowen, Queensland, before moving back out to sea.

Celia
 1962 – did not affect land.
 1966 – struck the Bahamas.
 1970 – formed in the Caribbean in late July, reached category 3, weakened, and restrengthened to a 125 mph storm prior to its landfall at Corpus Christi, Texas.
 1980 – remained well offshore of Mexico.
 1986 – remained well offshore of Mexico.
 1992 – Category 4 storm that stayed well at sea.
 1998 – stayed well off the coast of Mexico.
 2004 – stayed out to sea.
 2010 – a 160 mph Category 5 hurricane that remained offshore Mexico while at peak strength.
 2016 – churned in the open ocean, dissipated well east of Hawaii.
 2022 (March) – a deadly windstorm that impact across Portugal, Spain and Morocco, including heavy rain and accumulation of Saharan dust in parts of Spain.
 2022 (June) – formed off the coast of Central America and paralleled the southwestern coast of Mexico before moving out to sea.

Cempaka
2017 – a weak tropical cyclone that affected Java, Indonesia, bringing flooding that killed 47 people.
2021 - a typhoon that made landfall in Vietnam.

Cesar
 1984 – moved northeast parallel to the East Coast of the United States, losing tropical characteristics near Newfoundland
 1990 – formed west of Cape Verde but dissipated while still 1000 miles (1600 km) east of Bermuda
 1996 – formed off Venezuela and made landfall at Nicaragua as a Category 1 storm; killed 51 (26 in Costa Rica); crossed into the Pacific Ocean and became Hurricane Douglas

Chaba
2004 – a strong super typhoon that devastated Japan in 2004.
 2010 – approached Japan.
 2016 – a Category 5 super typhoon that affected South Korea and Japan.
 2022 - A typhoon that affected Southern China in July 2022.

Chalane (2020) – a tropical cyclone that affected Madagascar, Mozambique and Zimbabwe, killing only 7 people.

Champi
 2015 – a Category 4 typhoon that affected the Mariana Islands.
 2021 – a Category 1 typhoon that churned in the open ocean.

Chan-hom
 2003 – strong storm that stayed away from land.
 2009 – formed off Vietnam, reached typhoon status before landfall in the Philippines.
 2015 – a large typhoon which affected several countries in eastern Asia.
 2020 – a minimal typhoon that brushed Japan.

Chanchu
 2000 – formed from the remnants of Tropical Storm Upana.
 2006 – a Category 4 typhoon that traversed the Philippines and then made landfall in Guangdong, China.

Chantal
 1961 – a tropical cyclone off the coast of Madagascar.
 1983 – formed near Bermuda and dissipated in the open ocean.
 1989 – formed north of the Yucatán, made landfall as a Category 1 storm in Texas, causing 13 deaths, including 10 on an oil rig construction ship off Louisiana; $100 million damage reported.
 1995 – never threatened land, dissipated several hundred miles west of Ireland.
 2001 – degenerated into an open wave shortly after forming, then passed over Trinidad (causing two deaths) and strengthened back into a tropical storm before striking Belize, causing $5 million damage there.
 2007 – short-lived storm which caused moderate flooding damage in southeastern Newfoundland.
 2013 – formed west of the Cape Verde Islands and weakened before landfall in Hispaniola.
 2019 – meandered over the Central Atlantic without threatening land.

Chanthu
 2004 – struck Vietnam as a severe tropical storm.
 2010 – struck China as a Category 1 typhoon.
 2016 – brushed the eastern coast of Japan as a severe tropical storm.
 2021 - a category 5 super typhoon that threatened Cagayan Valley.

Chapala (2015) – an extremely severe cyclonic storm that impacted Somalia.

Charles (1978) – a Category 3 severe tropical cyclone that affected the Samoan Islands.

Charley
 1980 – Category 1 hurricane that looped across the north Atlantic Ocean without causing any reported damage in August.
 1986 – Category 1 hurricane that made landfall along the North Carolina coast killing five; went on to hit Great Britain and Ireland as a strong extratropical storm.
 1992 – Category 2 hurricane that drifted over the central Atlantic Ocean without affecting land in September.
 1998 – tropical storm in August that nearly became a hurricane before weakening and making landfall near Port Aransas, Texas, causing significant flood damage to inland areas and killing 13 people.
 2004 – destructive Category 4 storm that caused billions of dollars in damages, mostly in Southwest Florida.

Charlie
 1950 – Category 2 hurricane that did not affect land.
 1951 – powerful August hurricane that struck Cozumel, Mexico, and then mainland Mexico as a Category 4 storm.
 1952 – major hurricane that struck Santo Domingo, Dominican Republic, as a tropical storm before strengthening to a Category 3 hurricane staying well at sea.
 1972 – a subtropical cyclone that nearly reached hurricane force as it moved out to sea.
 1988 – struck Ayr, Queensland, in March, killing one person and leaving $2,300,000 (1988 USD) in damages.

Charlotte
1946 – remained in the open ocean.
1952 – formed in the South China Sea and made landfall near Hong Kong.
1956 – made landfall in the Philippines and then in Vietnam.
1959 – damaging Category 5 super typhoon that remained out to sea.
1973 – a weak tropical storm passed southwest of Réunion, rainfall damaged crops and flooded roads, causing one person to drown.
2009 – a Category 1 tropical cyclone that made landfall on the Cape York Peninsula.
2022 – a Category 4 severe tropical cyclone that affected Indonesia and East Timor.

Chedeng
 2003 – struck the Philippines and Japan
 2007 – struck Taiwan and China
 2011 – brushed the Philippines and as a Category 3 it approached Japan
 2015 – a strong typhoon of early 2015.
 2019 – a tropical depression that made landfall in Mindanao.

Cheneso (2023) – a strong tropical cyclone that affected Madagascar in January 2023.

Chloe
 1967 – long-lived Category 2 hurricane, churned in the open ocean.
 1971 – made landfall in Belize.
 1984 – Category 4 severe tropical cyclone (Australian scale), made landfall near Roebourne, Western Australia.
 1995 – Category 4 severe tropical cyclone (Australian scale), made landfall in the Kimberley region of Western Australia.

Choi-wan
 2003 – a Category 3 typhoon that stayed off the Japanese coast.
 2009 – moved through the Northern Mariana Islands as a Category 5 super typhoon.
 2015 – a large severe tropical storm that neared typhoon strength.
 2021 – a tropical storm which caused moderate flooding and damage in the Philippines and also affected Taiwan.
 
Chris
 1982 (January) – one of the strongest tropical cyclones in the Indian Ocean on record.
 1982 (September) – made landfall at Sabine Pass and caused widespread flooding as far inland as Tennessee, but total damage was low.
 1988 – caused three deaths in Puerto Rico then made landfall near Savannah, Georgia, killing one in South Carolina; monetary damage was minor.
 1991 – off Western Australia.
 1994 – a Category 1 hurricane that formed in mid-Atlantic, brushed Bermuda as a tropical storm, then continued north; no significant damage.
 2000 – formed several hundred miles east of the Lesser Antilles, but dissipated a day later; no damage was reported.
 2002 – one of the most powerful cyclones to strike Western Australia on record, packing winds gusting up to 290 km/h (180 mph).
 2006 – formed about 160 miles (260 km) east of the Leeward Islands; minimal damage was reported.
 2012 – a Category 1 hurricane that affected Bermuda.
 2018 – a Category 2 hurricane which formed off the coast of North Carolina.

 Christine
 1964 – a strong tropical storm that affected Mozambique and then hit Madagascar.
 1973 – was the first tropical cyclone to form as far east as longitude 30° W in the Atlantic Ocean since Tropical Storm Ginger in 1967.
 2013 – made landfall on Western Australia's Pilbara coast nearly halfway between the major towns of Karratha and Port Hedland as a category 4 cyclone on midnight of 31 December 2013.

Chuck
 1992 – made landfall on Hainan and in northern Vietnam
 1995 – remained out to sea

Cilla
 1988 – did not affect any land.
 2003 – a weak, short-lived tropical cyclone that affected a few South Pacific islands.
 
Cimaron
 2001 – brushed the Philippines and Taiwan
 2006 – affected the Philippines as a Category 5 super typhoon, causing several deaths
 2013 – struck the Philippines and China.
 2018 – a typhoon that caused minimal impacts in the Mariana Islands and Japan in August 2018.

Cindy
 1959 – caused minor damage to South Carolina.
 1963 – caused $12 million damage and three deaths in Texas and Louisiana.
 1970 – persisted in the Gulf of Carpentaria.
 1981 – formed between Bermuda and Nova Scotia, then moved east, ensuring it threatened no land.
 1987 – stayed in the open sea, dissipated hundreds of miles from the Azores.
 1993 – the tropical depression that became Cindy crossed Martinique, killing two; as a tropical storm, it made landfall on the Dominican Republic, killing two more.
 1998 – originally named Victor in the Australian region; renamed by Mauritius as Cindy as it passed into the Southwest Indian Ocean.
 1999 – reached Category 4 but never threatened land.
 2005 – made landfall near Grand Isle, Louisiana, as a weak hurricane; moderate flooding and some tornado damage reported; originally reported as a tropical storm but was later upgraded to a hurricane.
 2011 – formed northeast of Bermuda and moved out to sea.
 2017 – first tropical cyclone to make landfall in Louisiana since 2012's Hurricane Isaac.

Clara
 1950 – a powerful typhoon that passed off the coast of Taiwan and Japan.
 1955 – a powerful typhoon that passed off the coast of Taiwan and Japan and hit the northwestern provinces of China. 
 1959 – not areas land
1961 – not areas land
 1964 – made landfall on the coast of Aurora at Dilasac Bay.
 1967 – a Category 3 typhoon hit Taiwan and China.
 1970 – a category 2 typhoon that only slightly affected Japan
 1973 – not areas land
 1976 – a weak tropical storm that hit the coast of China.
 1977 – a category 1 Atlantic hurricane that formed off the East Coast of the United States and slightly affected Bermuda.
 1981 – left flooding in the northern Philippines and southern China during September 1981.
 1987 – not areas land

Claudette
 1979 (July) – caused moderate damage in Texas and the Caribbean
 1979 (December) – caused severe damage to Mauritius and Réunion.
 1985 – long-lived hurricane that wandered east and grazed the Azores.
1991 – low-end Category 4 that remained at sea for its entire lifetime.
 1997 – lasted awhile over the open Atlantic.
2003 – hit Puerto Morelos, Mexico, then struck again near Port O'Connor, Texas.
 2009 – formed south of Tallahassee, Florida, and headed northwest to the Florida Panhandle, where it made landfall on Santa Rosa Island.
 2015 – a short-lived tropical storm that formed off the coast of North Carolina and dissipated over the open Atlantic.
 2021 – was a weak tropical cyclone that caused heavy rain and tornadoes across the Southeastern United States in June 2021, leading to severe damage.

Claudia
 1962 – crossed over the western portion of the Baja California peninsula, moved over water, and again struck the peninsula before dissipating.
 1965 – never affected land.
 1969 – downgraded to a depression only 24 hours after first becoming a tropical storm; did not make landfall.
 1973 – made landfall approximately 30 mi (50 km) east of Acapulco; no deaths or casualties were reported.
 1977 – did not make a landfall.
 1982 – a weak tropical cyclone that affected the Solomon Islands.
 2002 –did not make a landfall.
 2012 – did not make a landfall.
 2020 – brought heavy rainfall to Darwin.

Cleo
 1958 – a category 4 hurricane that never made landfall.
 1960 – formed just outside the Caribbean Sea; travelled north without making landfall.
 1964 – travelled through the Caribbean Sea and later hit Florida, Georgia, and the Carolinas before moving offshore; killed 156 people and caused approximately US$187 million in damages.
 2009 – did not make landfall

Cliff
 1981 – struck the Gold Coast of Queensland, killing one person.
 1992 – did not affect land.
 2007 – affected Fiji and Tonga killing four people.
 2022 – short-lived storm that remained out at sea.

Cobra (1944) – a powerful tropical cyclone that struck the United States Pacific Fleet in December 1944, during World War II, killing 790 soldiers.

Cody (2022) – a strong tropical cyclone in the South Pacific which caused widespread damage in Fiji.

Colin
 1976 – moved parallel to the Australian coast without making landfall. 
 2010 – moved across the Atlantic, fluctuating between tropical depression and tropical storm status. Dissipated before reaching Bermuda. 
 2014 – churned through the open ocean as an intense tropical cyclone; never threatened land. 
 2016 – a disorganized tropical storm that made landfall in Florida causing significant damage.
 2022 – short-lived and weak tropical storm which formed inland over South Carolina.

Connie
 1945 – did not make landfall
 1955 – a Category 4 hurricane that contributed to significant flooding across the eastern United States in August 1955, just days before Hurricane Diane affected the same general area.
 1964 – a weak tropical storm with minor impact on Mozambique and South Africa.
 1966 (March) – 
 1966 (August) – no reported damage or deaths. 
 1970 – stalled 118 mi (190 km) from Clarion Island; did not make landfall.
 1974 – never made landfall.
 1987 – near Western Australia.
 2000 – affected the islands of Mauritius and Réunion.

Conson
 2004 – struck Japan
 2010 – struck the Philippines and Vietnam
 2016 – a tropical storm that neared northeastern Japan.
 2021 – rapidly intensified before making landfall in the Philippines and later Vietnam.

Cook (2017) – a severe tropical cyclone that impacted Vanuatu and New Caledonia.

Cora
1953 – no reported damage or deaths.
1958 – formed in the Central Pacific.
1961 – make landfall Vietnam.
1964 – peaked as a Category 5 super typhoon; made landfall in the Philippines as a tropical storm.
1966 – a Category 5 super typhoon; struck the Ryūkyū Islands
1969 – struck southern Japan
1972 – no damage was reported, and no one was killed.
1975 – re-curved east of Japan.
1978 – after crossing Central America into the Pacific Ocean, the system reformed and became Hurricane Kristy
1998 – some damage to Tonga

Cosme
 1983 – did not affect land.
 1989 – a large Category 1 hurricane that made landfall near Acapulco; brought heavy rains, which killed at least 30 people due to drowning.
 1995 – a Category 1 hurricane that never affected land, caused no damage or fatalities.
 2001, did not make landfall; dissipated about 820 mi (1,320 km) west-southwest of Cabo San Lucas, Mexico.
 2004 – for the strongest typhoon to strike the island of Yap in the Federated States of Micronesia in about 50 years.
 2007 – a Category 1 hurricane that stayed far from land, effects were mostly minor.
 2008 – caused 58 deaths and $94 million (USD) in damage in Luzon, leading to its retirement and being replaced by Carina for future seasons.
 2013 – a Category 1 hurricane; did not make landfall but caused minor damage to the west coast of Mexico and the Revillagigedo Islands.
 2019 – never threatened land.

Crising
 2001 – struck the Philippines
 2005 – a weak tropical depression only recognized by PAGASA
 2009 – a weak and disorganised tropical depression only recognized by PAGASA
 2013 – struck the Philippines and Malaysia as a weak tropical storm.
 2017 – crossed the Philippines as a tropical depression.
 2021 – a very small storm that struck Mindanao on early May; recognized by PAGASA and the Joint Typhoon Warning Center (JTWC) as a tropical storm.

Cristina
 1984 – did not affect any land
 1990 – did not make landfall
 1996 – made landfall near Puerto Ángel; claimed 13 lives and left 62 missing; 11 fishing boats were reported missing and 350 people were left homeless
 2002 – never threatened land; no impact reported
 2008 – did not make landfall
 2014 – peaked at Category 4 intensity
 2020 – never threatened land

Cristobal
 2002 – a relatively weak tropical storm causing only minor damage in Bermuda, drowned 3 due to rip currents in New York however
 2008 – formed near the South Carolina coast causing minimal damage
 2014 – a Category 1 hurricane that affected Caribbean islands, Bermuda, and the United States East Coast
 2020 – marked the earliest third-storm formation in the Atlantic since record-keeping began. It intensified over the Bay of Campeche before making landfall in Mexico, it then slowly turned north into the Gulf and made a second landfall in Louisiana as a moderate tropical storm.

Crystal
2002 – a Category 2 tropical cyclone that hit Mauritus.

Cyril
1984 – a weak tropical cyclone affected Fiji.
1996 – affected New Caledonia.
2012 – affected Fiji.

See also

Tropical cyclone
Tropical cyclone naming
European windstorm names
Atlantic hurricane season
List of Pacific hurricane seasons
South Atlantic tropical cyclone

References

General

 
 
 
 
 
 
 
 
 
 
 
 
 
 
 
 
 

 
 
 
 
 

C